The barattiere is a landrace variety of muskmelon (Cucumis melo) found in Southern Italy. It is common in the Apulia region of Italy and in the region of Sahel in Tunisia.

Uses
In Italian cuisine, barattiere is typically consumed in an immature, unripened state. It is consumed in the same manner in Tunisia.

See also
 Ark of Taste
 Carosello – another landrace variety of muskmelon

References

Further reading

External links
 Barattiere. Pugliaandculture.com.

Melons
Landraces